The list of seaplane carriers by country includes seaplane carriers and tenders organized by country of origin and service.

Australia
 HMAS Albatross:  seaplane tender in service from 1928 to 1933

France
 Foudre: Converted Torpedo boat Tender in service as a seaplane carrier from 1914 to 1918
 Compinas: Converted merchant ship in service as a seaplane tender from 1915 to 1916
 Nord: Converted merchant ship in service as a seaplane tender from 1915 to 1919
 Pas-de-Calais: Converted merchant ship in service as a seaplane tender from 1915 to 1919
 Rouen: Converted merchant ship in service as a seaplane tender from 1916 to 1919
 Petrel-class: Eight light inshore seaplane tenders in service from 1931 into World War II
 Commandant Teste: Seaplane transport and tender in service from 1932 to 1942
 Belfort: Converted Amiens-class sloop in service from 1939 to 1946
 Diligente: Converted Friponne-class sloop in service during 1940
 Paul Goffeny: Former German tug type seaplane tender in service from 1948 to 1955
 Robert Giraud: Former German tug type seaplane tender in service from 1948 to 1963
 Marcel le Bihan: Seaplane support ship from 1948 to 1961
Aircraft carrying submarine
 Surcouf: Aircraft carrying submarine in service from 1934 to 1942

Ethiopia 

 Training ship Ethiopia

Germany

World War I seaplane carriers
Answald (FS 1) auxiliary seaplane carrier
Santa Elena (FS II) auxiliary seaplane carrier 
Oswald (FS III) auxiliary seaplane carrier
Glyndwr auxiliary seaplane carrier
Adeline Hugo Stinnes auxiliary small seaplane carrier
Stuttgart seaplane cruiser
Roon planned seaplane cruiser

Civil Tender type catapult seaplane tenders
Westfalen
Schwabenland
Ostmark
Friesenland

World War II seaplane tenders (Luftwaffe)
Sperber catapult seaplane tender
Bussard-class catapult seaplane tenders
Bussard
Falke
Krischan-class small seaplane tenders
Krischan
Gunther Pluschow
Bernard Von Tschirschy
Hans Rolshoven
Karl Meyer-class small seaplane tenders
Karl Meyer
Max Stinsky
Imelmann
Boelcke
Hans Albrecht Wedel-class small seaplane tenders
Hans Albrecht Wedel
Richthofen
Hermann Kohl
Greif small seaplane tender
Ex-French Sans Souci-class small seaplane tenders
Jupiter/Merkur (SG1)
Saturn/Uranus (SG2)
Uranus/Saturn (SG3)
Merkur/Jupiter (SG4)

Italy
 Giuseppe Miraglia seaplane carrier (converted from train ferry shortly after launch), 1923–1950
 Europa (1895) (merchantman converted to seaplane carrier) – stricken 1920

Japan
 Akitsushima
 Kamoi
 Chitose-class (2 ships; both were converted to aircraft carriers)
 Mizuho
 Notoro
 Kamikawa Maru-class (4 ships, converted merchantmen)
 Nisshin
 I-400-class submarine 3 ships able to carry 3 seaplanes each

Portugal
 SS Cubango – cargo ship converted in a seaplane tender in 1931

Spain
 Dedalo 9,900 ton ex-German cargo ship Neuenfels 1901, transferred to Spain 1921, converted to seaplane carrier 1922. Scrapped 1 March 1940

Romania
 Regele Carol I – passenger steamer leased to Russia during World War I and converted to seaplane tender and minelayer, sunk during World War II in October 1941

Russia
Russia is one of birthplaces of naval aviation. Catchinskaia school of aviators (near Sevastopol) began to work in 1910 under the patronage of Admiral, Grand Duke Aleksandr Michailowich (Romanov-dynasty). Ships:
 Almaz  – Russian for "Diamond". Light (3d rank) cruiser of The Russian Imperial Navy. Veteran of the Tsushima Battle. Transferred from Far East to Black Sea Fleet. Participated in the 1914 Battle of Cape Sarytch (against "Goeben") and First Bombardment of Bosphorus 28 March 1915. In November 1914 converted to hydrocruiser (hydro aircraft carrier). Seaplanes from Almaz provide bombardment the targets on the Turkish and Bulgarian shores. After the October Revolution ship acquired a terrible reputation as a floating prison, where in 1918 revolutionary sailors executed the enemies of the revolution – officers, merchants and other "bourgeois" and "counter-revolutionaries".
 Imperator Nikolai Pervij –  Russian for "Emperor Nicholas The First". Hydro-avia-transport of the Black Sea Fleet. Aircraft from cruiser supported Army assaults on Caucasian Front, participated in Trapesund landings 1916.
 Princessa Maria – hydro-avia-transport of the Black Sea Fleet, converted from a Romanian liner. 
 Orlitsa – Russian for "She-Eagle", hydro-avia-transport of the Baltic Fleet. Attached to the Sea Force Riga Gulf. The day 16 of July 1916 when M-9s from "Orlitsa" engaged in a battle with four German sea planes and shot down two, is now celebrated in Russia as the Day of Naval Aviation. 
 Imperator Trajan – Russian for "Emperor Trajan", hydro-avia-transport of the Black Sea Fleet, converted from Romanian steamer. Take active service during WWI Black Sea Campaign.
 Dacia – hydro-avia-transport of the Black Sea Fleet. Converted from a Romanian steamer. Take active service during WWI Black Sea Campaign.
 Imperator Alexandr Pervij – Russian "Emperor Alexander The First", hydro-avia-transport of the Black Sea Fleet. Converted from a merchant steamer. Sea planes from "Alexander I" and  "Nicholas I" 24.01.1916 participated in bombing Turkish port of Zonguldack and sinking transports there. Later participated in Trapesund landings – aircraft from the ship covered landing ships and acted as artillery observers for the battleships.
 Ruminia – Russian for "Romania". Hydro-avia-transport of the Black Sea Fleet. Converted from Romanian merchant steamer.
 Communa – one of the hydro-avia-transports of the Bolshevik Volga Military Flotilla during the Russian Civil War. Participated in fighting against White movement fleets and armies on the Volga river.

Sweden
 Jacob Bagge
 Dristigheten
 Gotland

United Kingdom
 HMS Hermes protected cruiser converted to seaplane carrier in 1913
 HMS Ben-my-Chree packet steamer converted to seaplane carrier in 1915
 HMS Engadine packet ship converted to seaplane tender in 1914
 HMS Campania ocean liner converted to seaplane tender in 1915
 HMS Ark Royal first purpose-built seaplane carrier, commissioned 1914
 HMS Riviera (1914–1919) packet ship converted to seaplane tender in 1914
 HMS Empress (1914–1919) packet ship converted to seaplane carrier in 1914
 HMS Raven II freighter used as seaplane carrier
 HMS Anne freighter used as seaplane carrier
 HMS M2 – M-class submarine converted to carry a seaplane in 1927
 HMS Vindex passenger ferry converted to seaplane carrier 1915
 HMS Manxman steamer converted to seaplane carrier in 1916
 HMS Pegasus purchased incomplete and converted to seaplane carrier 1917
HMS Manela steamer converted to seaplane tender in 1939

United States
For an explanation of the US Navy AV, AVD, and AVP seaplane tender (and other) designations see the Hull classification symbol article.

United States AVs

United States AVDs

United States AVPs

Yugoslavia
  entered service in 1930, converted to minelayer in 1937

See also
Aircraft repair ship

Notes

Bibliography
 
 

Seaplane Carriers
Seaplane Carriers
Seaplane Carriers